Li Fanghui (born 10 March 2003) is a Chinese freestyle skier. She competed at the 2022 Winter Olympics.

Career
Li made her FIS Freestyle World Ski Championships debut in 2019 and finished in fifth place in the halfpipe event.

Li competed at the 2020 Winter Youth Olympics and won a silver medal in the halfpipe event.

She represented China at the 2022 Winter Olympics in the halfpipe event.

References

2003 births
Living people
Freestyle skiers at the 2020 Winter Youth Olympics
Medalists at the 2020 Winter Youth Olympics
Freestyle skiers at the 2022 Winter Olympics
Chinese female freestyle skiers
Olympic freestyle skiers of China
Skiers from Harbin